Bahadurpur may refer to:

 Bahadurpur, Bangladesh
 Bahadurpur, Gujarat, India
 Bahadurpur, Nawanshahr, a village in Shaheed Bhagat Singh Nagar district of Punjab State, India
 Bahadurpur, Paschim Bardhaman, a village in Paschim Bardhaman district, West Bengal, India
 Bahadurpur, Palpa, Nepal
 Bahadurpur, Sarlahi, Nepal
 Bahadur Pur, Jalalpur Pirwala, Pakistan
 Bahadurpura, Punjab, Pakistan
 Bahadurpur, Raebareli, a village in Uttar Pradesh, India